Such Pain is a novel by Don Bassingthwaite published by Boxtree Books in 1995.

Plot summary
Such Pain is a Mage: The Ascension novel in which Aaron Barry must cope with the death of his father and return to his childhood home.

Reception
Andy Butcher reviewed Such Pain for Arcane magazine, rating it a 7 out of 10 overall.

Reviews
Review by John C. Bunnell (1995) in Dragon Magazine, #219, July 1995
Review by John D. Owen (1996) in Vector 189

References

1995 novels
Mage: The Ascension
World of Darkness novels